Vittorio Bissaro (born 1 June 1987) is an Italian competitive sailor.

He competed at the 2016 Summer Olympics in Rio de Janeiro, in the mixed Nacra 17 pairing with Silvia Sicouri at his bow. After sailing consistently throughout the qualification series, Bissaro-Sicouri dramatically lost one Olympic Medal in the Final race because of some  major tactical mistakes and finished fifth overall.

References

External links
 
 
 

1987 births
Living people
Italian male sailors (sport)
Olympic sailors of Italy
Sailors at the 2016 Summer Olympics – Nacra 17
Sailors of Fiamme Azzurre